GSW may refer to:

 GSW Immobilien, a company in Berlin
 Georgia Southwestern State University, in the United States
 Geological Society of Washington
 God Street Wine, a New York City-based rock band
 Golden State Warriors, a professional basketball team
 General Santos Warriors, a semi-professional Filipino basketball team
 Grape Street Watts Crips, a Los Angeles street gang
 Great spotted woodpecker, a species of bird
 Greater Southwest International Airport, in Fort Worth, Texas, now closed
 Gunshot wound
 HolidayJet, a defunct Swiss airline
 MIT Global Startup Workshop, an international entrepreneurship conference.
 Sky Wings Airlines, a defunct Greek airline
 General Steel Wares, Canadian appliance maker

gsw may refer to:
 Alsatian or Swiss German (in ISO 639)